Ganton Scott (March 23, 1903 – June 9, 1977) was a Canadian ice hockey right winger who played four seasons in the National Hockey League during the 1920s for the Toronto St. Pats, Hamilton Tigers, Montreal Maroons and Toronto Maple Leafs. He also played in the Western Hockey League and the California Hockey League, retiring in 1932 He was born in Little Current, Ontario and died in San Diego, California.

Playing career
As a teenaged amateur player, Scott first attracted the attention of professional scouts in 1922 when he led the Toronto Aura Lee junior team in scoring. That team, which also featured future NHL'ers "Baldy" Cotton and Alfie Moore, won the Eastern Canadian championship and was eliminated by the eventual Memorial Cup champion Fort William War Veterans. That October, Scott signed a professional contract to play for the Toronto St. Pats.

Despite his reputation as a prolific scorer in juniors, Scott failed to thrive in the NHL. His playing time in Toronto dwindled, and after 21 scoreless games he was traded to the Hamilton Tigers in January 1924. The Tigers declined to retain him, and Scott signed with the Montreal Maroons as a free agent in October 1924. He played a career high of 28 games for the Maroons, scoring his only NHL goal on January 17, 1925, against his former St. Pats team.

With only 1 goal and 1 assist in 53 career games, Scott left the NHL to sign with the Edmonton Eskimos of the Western Hockey League in December 1925. After 7 scoreless games, his rights were traded to the Saskatoon Crescents. Scott played 6 games in Saskatoon, scoring 1 assist. In February, he left the financially unstable WHL to sign with the Palais-de-Glace team of the upstart California Professional Hockey League.

Now playing at a much lower level of competition, Scott became a star in the California circuit. He played for 6 different teams between 1926 and 1932, leading the league in goals and points in 1928–29. From 1927–28 to 1932–33, the only seasons in which complete CPHL statistics are available, Scott led all players in goals with 86 and was second in points with 118.

Career statistics

Regular season and playoffs

External links

1903 births
1977 deaths
Canadian ice hockey right wingers
Edmonton Eskimos (ice hockey) players
Hamilton Tigers (ice hockey) players
Ice hockey people from Ontario
Montreal Maroons players
Saskatoon Sheiks players
People from Manitoulin District
Toronto Maple Leafs players
Toronto St. Pats players
Canadian expatriate ice hockey players in the United States